The Clifford–Warren House is an historic First Period house at 3 Clifford Road in Plymouth, Massachusetts.  The -story gambrel-roofed Cape style house was built c. 1695.  It is five bays wide, with a large central chimney.  The house is believed to be the third on the property, which was granted to Richard Warren in 1627.  Its most notable resident was probably James Warren, a noted political opponent of British rule and a signer of the United States Declaration of Independence.

The house was listed on the National Register of Historic Places in 1980.

See also
National Register of Historic Places listings in Plymouth County, Massachusetts

References

Houses completed in 1695
Houses in Plymouth, Massachusetts
National Register of Historic Places in Plymouth County, Massachusetts
Houses on the National Register of Historic Places in Plymouth County, Massachusetts
1695 establishments in Massachusetts